In Love Again! is a 1964 studio album by Peggy Lee, arranged by Dick Hazard, Bill Holman and Shorty Rogers.

Track listing
 "A Lot of Livin' to Do" (Lee Adams, Charles Strouse) - 2:34
 "I've Got Your Number" (Cy Coleman, Carolyn Leigh) - 1:59
 "Little By Little" (Walter O'Keefe, Bobby Dolan) – 2:03
 "Got That Magic" (Bill Schluger, Peggy Lee) – 1:40
 "The Moment of Truth" (Frank Scott, Tex Satterwhite) – 1:53
 "That's My Style" (Cy Coleman, Lee) – 2:38
 "I Can't Stop Loving You" (Don Gibson) - 3:05
 "Unforgettable" (Irving Gordon) - 2:25
 "Once" (Ils S'aimaient) (Magenta, Marnay, Norman Gimbel) - 2:38
 "(I'm) In Love Again (Lee, Cy Coleman) - 2:51
 "I Got Lost In His Arms" (Irving Berlin) - 2:30
 "How Insensitive" (Insensatez) (Norman Gimbel, Antônio Carlos Jobim) - 2:48

References

1964 albums
Capitol Records albums
Peggy Lee albums
Albums arranged by Richard Hazard
Albums arranged by Shorty Rogers
Albums produced by Dave Cavanaugh